Two ships of the Royal Navy have been named HMS P48.

 , a P-class patrol boat launched in 1917 and sold in 1923.
 , a U-class submarine launched in June 1942 and sunk by Italian torpedo boats on Christmas Day 1942.

References
 

Royal Navy ship names